Patrick Zygmanowski (born 1970 in Langon) is a French classical pianist and piano teacher.

References

External links 
 Zygmanowski, Ravel Gaspard de la nuit, Ondine, Scarbo (YouTube)
 Biography on Vimeo
 Patrick Zygmanowski on AllMusic

1970 births
Living people
Conservatoire de Paris alumni
21st-century French male classical pianists
Academic staff of the École Normale de Musique de Paris
People from Langon, Gironde